In derivatives trading, the term diagonal spread is applied to an options spread position that shares features of both a calendar spread and a vertical spread. It is established by simultaneously buying and selling equal amount of option contracts of the same type (call options or put options) but with different strike prices and expiration dates.

Example

External links
http://www.thestreet.com/story/10080609/1/real-world-trading-the-diagonal-spread.html
Short Diagonal Call/Put Credit Spreads

Options (finance)